The 2022 Super Rugby Pacific Final was played between the  and the , both of New Zealand. It was the 25th final in the Super Rugby competition's history, and the first since 2019 after the 2020 Super Rugby season was cancelled due to the COVID-19 pandemic and regional tournaments were played in the 2021 Super Rugby season. The Blues had qualified in first place on the regular season standings, while the Crusaders had qualified in second place. Both teams hosted quarter-final and semi-final matches.

The final was won by the Crusaders who beat the Blues by fourteen points. The Crusaders stretched their record number of Super Rugby wins to eleven, while also stretching their number of titles won to thirteen, having won both the 2020 Super Rugby Aotearoa season and 2021 Super Rugby Aotearoa season.

Road to the final 

The 2022 season was a 12-team competition. The conference system from previous years was removed, with a single table introduced instead. The top 4 sides in the competition earned home quarter finals, with the following four sides in the table playing against them. 

The Blues had finished top of the overall table, having won thirteen of their fourteen fixtures round robin fixtures, and had won fifteen fixtures in a row heading into the final. The Crusaders had finished second overall having won eleven of their round robin fixtures. Heading into the fixture, Stephen Perofeta of the Blues was the competition's top points scorer, with 127 points, while Leicester Fainga'anuku and Will Jordan, both of the Crusaders, were the competition's top try scorers, both with ten tries.

Because of being the higher placed team in the regular season log standings, the final was held in Auckland.

Quarterfinals

Semifinals

Final 

The final was held at Eden Park in Auckland. Weather conditions were wet with persistent drizzle. Two other sets of brothers also partook in the fixture, with the Goodhue brothers (Jack for the Crusaders and Josh for the Blues) and the Ioane brothers (Akira and Rieko both for the Blues) joining the Barrett brothers in the fixture.

Details

References 

2022 Super Rugby Pacific season
Super Rugby finals
2022 in New Zealand rugby union
Crusaders (rugby union) matches
Sports competitions in Auckland